Fathy Farghali served as Deputy Regional Director for Community Development of the World Scout Bureau Arab Regional Scout Office.

In 2011, he was awarded the 329th Bronze Wolf, the only distinction of the World Organization of the Scout Movement, awarded by the World Scout Committee for exceptional services to world Scouting.

References

External links

Recipients of the Bronze Wolf Award
Year of birth missing
Scouting and Guiding in Switzerland